Darren Homan is a former Gaelic footballer from Kilnamanagh, Tallaght. He played for the Dublin county team.

Homan retired in 2005 from the Dublin senior football panel after the 2005 quarter-final against Tyrone due to injury. He left Ballyboden St Enda's to join Round Towers in Clondalkin, although it has recently been announced that he will rejoin Ballyboden for next season. Prior to his first spell with Ballyboden he had played his club football with St Kevin's of Kilnamanagh.

Homan is an electrician by trade and is a firefighter in the Dublin Fire Brigade.

References

1978 births
Living people
Dublin inter-county Gaelic footballers
Irish electricians
Irish firefighters
St Kevin's Killians Gaelic footballers
Ballyboden St Enda's Gaelic footballers
Round Towers Clondalkin Gaelic footballers